Paederus baudii is a species of rove beetle belonging to the family Staphylinidae subfamily Paederinae.

Distribution and habitat
These beetles are mainly present in France, Italy, and Switzerland. They can mainly be encountered in moisty habitats, especially on the banks of ponds and marshy meadows.

Description

The head is black, antennae and legs are yellowish, while the apex of the femora is black. Pronotum is red. The elytra are black. Abdomen is black except for the first 4 segments that are red. This species has a very narrow base of elytra, elytra widened in the back and the head much bigger than similar ones.

Biology
They can secrete by abdominal glands an urticant substance. Larvae and adults are predators of small insects.

References

External links

 Biolib

Paederinae
Beetles of Europe
Beetles described in 1859